Ibn Abbad al-Rundi (in full, Abu 'abd Allah Muhammad Ibn Abi Ishaq Ibrahim An-nafzi Al-himyari Ar-rundi) (1333–1390) was one of the leading Sufi theologians of his time who was born in Ronda. Attracted to Morocco by the famous madrasahs, Ibn Abbad emigrated there at an early age. He spent most of his life in Morocco, living in different cities (Salé, Marrakesh, Fes...), and was buried in Bab al-Futuh (south-eastern gate) cemetery in Fes.

Influence 
Ibn Abbad has been suggested as a key influence on and precursor to St. John of the Cross, in particular his account of the dark night of the soul, in the work of Miguel Asín Palacios.

References

Sources 
Ibn Abbad of Ronda: Letters on the Sufi Path, transl. John Renard (New York 1986) 
 Los Más Hermosos Nombres de Dios. Versión aljamiada de la plegaria mística escrita por Ibn `Abbâd de Ronda (s.XIV), ed. Xavier Casassas Canals  

"Saint-Jean de la Croix, Ibn ‘Abbâd de Ronda et la survivance en Espagne de la mystique musulmane en langue castillane jusqu’à la fin du XVIe siècle", a Horizons Maghrébins. L'héritage de l'Espagne des trois cultures, n° 61 (2010), pp.63-69, from Xavier Casassas Canals.
E. Geoffroy, Paris: Maisonneuve & Larose, 2004.), from Dr. Kenneth L. Honerkamp.

1333 births
1390 deaths
14th-century Arabs
14th-century Muslim theologians
Sufis from al-Andalus
People from Ronda
Moroccan letter writers
Moroccan Sufi writers
People from Fez, Morocco
14th-century Moroccan writers